Naveed Khan (born 7 January 2000) is a Pakistani-born Hong Kong professional footballer who currently plays as a winger for Hong Kong Premier League club Tai Po.

Early life
At the age of 12, Khan started playing football.

Club career
Khan started his career with Eastern. On 27 March 2021, Khan made his league debut for Eastern during a 3–1 win over Rangers. On 28 October 2020, Khan scored his first 2 goals for Eastern during a 5–0 Sapling Cup win over Resources Capital.

On 20 April 2022, Khan left Eastern.

On 8 August 2022, Khan joined Tai Po.

International career
On 9 March 2023, Khan officially announced that he had received a Hong Kong passport after giving up his Pakistani passport, making him eligible to represent Hong Kong internationally.

Career statistics

Club

References

External links
 
 Naveed Khan at playmakerstats.com

Pakistani footballers
Hong Kong footballers
Living people
Hong Kong Premier League players
Eastern Sports Club footballers
Tai Po FC players
2000 births
Association football forwards